Turbonilla mighelsi is a species of sea snail, a marine gastropod mollusk in the family Pyramidellidae, the pyrams and their allies.

Description
The length of the shell reaches 3.8 mm.

Distribution
This species occurs in the following locations:
 Northwest Atlantic Ocean : range: 41.5°N to 41.3°N; 72.9°W to 70.7°W. ( USA: Massachusetts, Connecticut)

References

 Bush, K. J. 1909. Notes on the family Pyramidellidae. American Journal of Science 27: 475-484.
 Verrill, A. E. 1873. Report on the invertebrate animals of Vineyard Sound and the adjacent waters, with an account of the physical characters of the region. United States Commission of Fish and Fisheries, Report, 1871 and 1872: 295-778, pls. 1-18.

External links
 To Biodiversity Heritage Library (6 publications)
 To Encyclopedia of Life
 To USNM Invertebrate Zoology Mollusca Collection
 To ITIS
 To World Register of Marine Species

mighelsi
Gastropods described in 1909